Cyana meyricki is a moth of the family Erebidae first described by Walter Rothschild and Karl Jordan in 1901. It is found in Australia, where it has been recorded from Queensland and New South Wales.

The forewings are brown with black edges. The hindwings are black with a yellow spot in the centre.

This larvae feed on lichens and algae growing on dead wood. Pupation takes place in a cocoon which has the form of an open square mesh cage, constructed out of larval hairs held together with silk.

References

Cyana
Moths described in 1901